Tshumbe Airport  is an airport serving the city of Tshumbe in Sankuru Province, Democratic Republic of the Congo. The runway is just southwest of the town.

See also

Transport in the Democratic Republic of the Congo
 List of airports in the Democratic Republic of the Congo

References

External links
OpenStreetMap - Tshumbe
 OurAirports - Tshumbe
 Mapcarta - Tshumbe
 Tshumbe

Airports in Sankuru